The 1980 Houston Astros season was the 19th season for the Major League Baseball (MLB) franchise in Houston, Texas.

After a late collapse in 1979, the Astros finished in a tie for first place in the National League West with a record of 92–70 with the Los Angeles Dodgers, having lost three in a row in Los Angeles on the final series of the season. The teams played a one-game playoff on October 6 to determine the division champion, which the Astros won, marking the first time in franchise history that the team qualified for the postseason. They went on to face the Philadelphia Phillies in the NLCS, losing three games to two.

Offseason 
 October 26, 1979: Keith Drumright was sent by the Astros to the Kansas City Royals to complete an earlier deal (the Astros sent a player to be named later to the Royals for George Throop) made on April 27, 1979.
 November 19, 1979: Nolan Ryan was signed as a free agent by the Astros.
 January 31, 1980: Joe Morgan was signed as a free agent by the Astros.
 February 21, 1980: Frank Riccelli was released by the Astros.

Regular season 
On July 4, pitcher Nolan Ryan recorded the 3,000th strikeout of his career by striking out César Gerónimo of the Cincinnati Reds.

Season standings

Record vs. opponents

Opening Day starters 
 Alan Ashby
 Enos Cabell
 César Cedeño
 José Cruz
 Art Howe
 Joe Morgan
 Terry Puhl
 Craig Reynolds
 J. R. Richard

Roster

Game log

Regular season

|-style="background:#cfc;"
| 1 || April 10 || 7:35p.m. CST || Dodgers || W 3–2 || Richard (1–0) || Hooton (0–1) || Sambito (1) || 2:03 || 33,270 || 1–0 || W1
|-style="background:#cfc;"
| 2 || April 11 || 7:35p.m. CST || Dodgers || W 10–6 || Smith (1–0) || Stanhouse (0–1) || – || 2:58 || 30,701 || 2–0 || W2
|-style="background:#fcc;"
| 3 || April 12 || 3:15p.m. CST || Dodgers || L 5–6  || Howe (1–0) || Smith (1–1) || Hooton (1) || 5:35 || 24,609 || 2–1 || L1
|-style="background:#cfc;"
| 4 || April 13 || 2:05p.m. CST || Dodgers || W 4–2 || Forsch (1–0) || Goltz (0–1) || LaCorte (1) || 2:19 || 33,676 || 3–1 || W1
|-style="background:#cfc;"
| 5 || April 14 || 7:35p.m. CST || Braves || W 5–4 || Sambito (1–0) || Garber (0–1) || – || 3:15 || 15,017 || 4–1 || W2
|-style="background:#cfc;"
| 6 || April 15 || 7:35p.m. CST || Braves || W 6–2 || Niekro (1–0) || McWilliams (0–2) || – || 2:14 || 15,712 || 5–1 || W3
|-style="background:#fcc;"
| 7 || April 17 || 3:00p.m. CST || @ Dodgers || L 4–6 || Reuss (1–0) || Smith (1–2) || – || 3:06 || 45,476 || 5–2 || L1
|-style="background:#cfc;"
| 8 || April 18 || 9:30p.m. CST || @ Dodgers || W 7–4 || Forsch (2–0) || Goltz (0–2) || Andújar (1) || 3:20 || 41,112 || 6–2 || W1
|-style="background:#cfc;"
| 9 || April 19 || 9:00p.m. CST || @ Dodgers || W 2–0 || Richard (2–0) || Welch (0–1) || – || 2:40 || 50,112 || 7–2 || W2
|-style="background:#fcc;"
| 10 || April 20 || 3:00p.m. CST || @ Dodgers || L 2–4 || Reuss (2–0) || Niekro (1–1) || – || 2:27 || 39,442 || 7–3 || L1
|-style="background:#fcc;"
| 11 || April 21 || 7:35p.m. CST || Reds || L 5–6 || LaCoss (3–0) || Ruhle (0–1) || Hume (3) || 3:09 || 29,067 || 7–4 || L2
|-style="background:#cfc;"
| 12 || April 22 || 7:35p.m. CST || Reds || W 8–0 || Ryan (1–0) || Pastore (2–1) || – || 2:45 || 30,094 || 8–4 || W1
|-style="background:#fcc;"
| 13 || April 23 || 7:35p.m. CST || Reds || L 2–3  || Hume (2–0) || Andújar (0–1) || Bair (1) || 3:39 || 29,828 || 8–5 || L1
|-style="background:#cfc;"
| 14 || April 25 || 7:35p.m. CST || Mets || W 7–4 || Richard (3–0) || Falcone (1–1) || – || 2:52 || 24,140 || 9–5 || W1
|-style="background:#cfc;"
| 15 || April 26 || 7:35p.m. CST || Mets || W 6–0 || Niekro (2–1) || Glynn (0–1) || LaCorte (2) || 2:42 || 44,540 || 10–5 || W2
|-style="background:#cfc;"
| 16 || April 27 || 2:05p.m. CDT || Mets || W 4–3  || LaCorte (1–0) || Allen (0–3) || – || 3:37 || 20,828 || 11–5 || W3
|-style="background:#cfc;"
| 17 || April 29 || 7:05p.m. CDT || @ Reds || W 3–0 || Forsch (3–0) || Leibrandt (1–2) || – || 2:14 || 18,092 || 12–5 || W4
|-style="background:#cfc;"
| 18 || April 30 || 7:05p.m. CDT || @ Reds || W 5–1 || Richard (4–0) || Seaver (1–1) || – || 2:21 || 19,821 || 13–5 || W5
|-

|-style="background:#cfc;"
| 19 || May 1 || 7:05p.m. CDT || @ Reds || W 9–3 || Niekro (3–1) || LaCoss (3–2) || – || 3:00 || 18,215 || 14–5 || W6
|-style="background:#fcc;"
| 20 || May 2 || 7:38p.m. CDT || @ Cardinals || L 1–9 || Hood (1–1) || Ryan (1–1) || Kaat (1) || 2:39 || 23,009 || 14–6 || L1
|-style="background:#cfc;"
| 21 || May 3 || 7:10p.m. CDT || @ Cardinals || W 4–2 || Ruhle (1–1) || Martínez (1–2) || Sambito (2) || 2:10 || 23,292 || 15–6 || W1
|-style="background:#cfc;"
| 22 || May 4 || 1:19p.m. CDT || @ Cardinals || W 4–2 || Forsch (4–0) || Sykes (1–3) || LaCorte (3) || 2:37 || 17,262 || 16–6 || W2
|-style="background:#fcc;"
| 23 || May 5 || 12:35p.m. CDT || @ Expos || L 1–10 || Palmer (1–0) || Richard (4–1) || – || 2:41 || 5,477 || 16–7 || L1
|-style="background:#cfc;"
| 24 || May 6 || 12:35p.m. CDT || @ Expos || W 8–4 || Niekro (4–1) || Grimsley (1–2) || – || 2:33 || 5,503 || 17–7 || W1
|-style="background:#fcc;"
| 25 || May 7 || 12:35p.m. CDT || @ Expos || L 0–3 || Sanderson (2–2) || Ryan (1–2) || Fryman (3) || 2:29 || 7,386 || 17–8 || L1
|-style="background:#fcc;"
| 26 || May 9 || 6:35p.m. CDT || @ Braves || L 4–5 || McWilliams (2–2) || Forsch (4–1) || Bradford (1) || 2:21 || 11,111 || 17–9 || L2
|-style="background:#cfc;"
| 27 || May 10 || 6:35p.m. CDT || @ Braves || W 3–2  || LaCorte (2–0) || Garber (1–2) || Sambito (3) || 3:15 || 13,798 || 18–9 || W1
|-style="background:#fcc;"
| 28 || May 11 || 1:15p.m. CDT || @ Braves || L 4–7 || Niekro (2–4) || Niekro (4–2) || – || 2:25 || 10,871 || 18–10 || L1
|-style="background:#fcc;"
| 29 || May 13 || 7:35p.m. CDT || Expos || L 2–3 || Palmer (2–0) || Ryan (1–3) || – || 2:42 || 24,835 || 18–11 || L2
|-style="background:#fcc;"
| 30 || May 14 || 7:35p.m. CDT || Expos || L 0–1 || Sanderson (3–2) || Forsch (4–2) || Fryman (5) || 2:19 || 20,636 || 18–12 || L3
|-style="background:#fcc;"
| 31 || May 16 || 7:35p.m. CDT || Phillies || L 0–3 || Ruthven (4–2) || Richard (4–2) || – || 2:06 || 33,610 || 18–13 || L4
|-style="background:#fcc;"
| 32 || May 17 || 7:35p.m. CDT || Phillies || L 2–4 || Christenson (3–0) || Niekro (4–3) || Noles (3) || 2:25 || 43,525 || 18–14 || L5
|-style="background:#cfc;"
| 33 || May 18 || 2:05p.m. CDT || Phillies || W 3–0 || Ryan (2–3) || Lerch (2–3) || – || 2:07 || 33,950 || 19–14 || W1
|-style="background:#cfc;"
| 34 || May 20 || 7:05p.m. CDT || @ Mets || W 3–2 || Forsch (5–2) || Swan (2–3) || – || 2:29 || 8,466 || 20–14 || W2
|-style="background:#fcc;"
| 35 || May 21 || 7:05p.m. CDT || @ Mets || L 1–5 || Falcone (3–2) || Richard (4–3) || Allen (7) || 2:37 || 4,233 || 20–15 || L1
|-style="background:#cfc;"
| 36 || May 22 || 7:05p.m. CDT || @ Mets || W 8–5 || Niekro (5–3) || Kobel (0–4) || LaCorte (4) || 2:55 || 7,812 || 21–15 || W1
|-style="background:#fcc;"
| 37 || May 23 || 7:05p.m. CDT || @ Phillies || L 0–3 || Carlton (8–2) || Ryan (2–4) || – || 2:11 || 27,822 || 21–16 || L1
|-style="background:#fcc;"
| 38 || May 24 || 6:05p.m. CDT || @ Phillies || L 4–5 || Saucier (2–3) || Andújar (0–2) || McGraw (3) || 2:28 || 28,539 || 21–17 || L2
|-style="background:#fcc;"
| 39 || May 25 || 12:35p.m. CDT || @ Phillies || L 2–6 || Ruthven (5–3) || Forsch (5–3) || – || 2:10 || 37,340 || 21–18 || L3
|-style="background:#cfc;"
| 40 || May 26 || 7:35p.m. CDT || Padres || W 4–1 || Richard (5–3) || Curtis (3–4) || Sambito (4) || 2:59 || 18,242 || 22–18 || W1
|-style="background:#cfc;"
| 41 || May 27 || 7:35p.m. CDT || Padres || W 4–3 || LaCorte (3–0) || Fingers (5–5) || – || 2:47 || 18,246 || 23–18 || W2
|-style="background:#cfc;"
| 42 || May 28 || 7:35p.m. CDT || Padres || W 1–0 || Ryan (3–4) || Wise (2–3) || – || 2:30 || 19,697 || 24–18 || W3
|-style="background:#fcc;"
| 43 || May 30 || 9:38p.m. CDT || @ Giants || L 2–3 || Blue (8–2) || Forsch (5–4) || – || 2:19 || 10,511 || 24–19 || L1
|-style="background:#cfc;"
| 44 || May 31 || 3:09p.m. CDT || @ Giants || W 5–0 || Richard (6–3) || Montefusco (2–4) || – || 2:15 || 11,649 || 25–19 || W1
|-

|-style="background:#fcc;"
| 45 || June 1 || 3:09p.m. CDT || @ Giants || L 2–6 || Knepper (4–6) || Niekro (5–4) || – || 2:35 || 19,801 || 25–20 || L1
|-style="background:#fcc;"
| 46 || June 2 || 9:00p.m. CDT || @ Padres || L 0–3 || Wise (3–3) || Ryan (3–5) || Rasmussen (1) || 2:16 || 27,176 || 25–21 || L2
|-style="background:#cfc;"
| 47 || June 3 || 9:00p.m. CDT || @ Padres || W 3–2 || Ruhle (2–1) || Jones (4–4) || LaCorte (5) || 2:20 || 12,363 || 26–21 || W1
|-style="background:#cfc;"
| 48 || June 4 || 9:00p.m. CDT || @ Padres || W 4–3 || Forsch (6–4) || Fingers (5–6) || Sambito (5) || 2:27 || 13,619 || 27–21 || W2
|-style="background:#cfc;"
| 49 || June 6 || 7:35p.m. CDT || Giants || W 2–0 || Richard (7–3) || Knepper (4–7) || – || 2:02 || 26,822 || 28–21 || W3
|-style="background:#cfc;"
| 50 || June 7 || 7:35p.m. CDT || Giants || W 3–0 || Niekro (6–4) || Whitson (2–7) || – || 2:05 || 42,263 || 29–21 || W4
|-style="background:#cfc;"
| 51 || June 8 || 7:35p.m. CDT || Giants || W 5–4 || Sambito (2–0) || Minton (2–3) || – || 2:30 || 28,327 || 30–21 || W5
|-style="background:#cfc;"
| 52 || June 9 || 7:35p.m. CDT || Cubs || W 6–2 || Forsch (7–4) || Lamp (6–2) || – || 2:31 || 19,022 || 31–21 || W6
|-style="background:#cfc;"
| 53 || June 10 || 7:35p.m. CDT || Cubs || W 5–2 || Ruhle (3–1) || Krukow (3–7) || – || 2:22 || 21,201 || 32–21 || W7
|-style="background:#cfc;"
| 54 || June 11 || 7:35p.m. CDT || Cubs || W 3–0 || Richard (8–3) || Reuschel (5–6) || – || 2:18 || 31,599 || 33–21 || W8
|-style="background:#bbb;"
|–|| June 12 || || Cubs || colspan=8 | Postponed (Schedule change) (Makeup date: June 9)
|-style="background:#fcc;"
| 55 || June 13 || 6:35p.m. CDT || @ Pirates || L 3–5 || Solomon (4–0) || Niekro (6–5) || Tekulve (9) || 2:35 || 31,854 || 33–22 || L1
|-style="background:#cfc;"
| 56 || June 14 || 6:05p.m. CDT || @ Pirates || W 7–3 || Ryan (4–5) || Robinson (2–2) || LaCorte (6) || 3:08 || 33,922 || 34–22 || W1
|-style="background:#fcc;"
| 57 || June 15 || 12:35p.m. CDT || @ Pirates || L 1–4 || Candelaria (4–5) || Forsch (7–5) || – || 2:08 || 49,541 || 34–23 || L1
|-style="background:#cfc;"
| 58 || June 16 || 1:30p.m. CDT || @ Cubs || W 2–1 || Ruhle (4–1) || Hernández (1–5) || Smith (1) || 2:35 || 15,289 || 35–23 || W1
|-style="background:#cfc;"
| 59 || June 17 || 1:30p.m. CDT || @ Cubs || W 7–1 || Richard (9–3) || McGlothen (3–4) || Andújar (2) || 2:54 || 19,480 || 36–23 || W2
|-style="background:#cfc;"
| 60 || June 18 || 7:35p.m. CDT || Cardinals || W 3–0 || Niekro (7–5) || Kaat (1–4) || – || 2:08 || 24,459 || 37–23 || W3
|-style="background:#cfc;"
| 61 || June 19 || 7:35p.m. CDT || Cardinals || W 2–0 || Ryan (5–5) || Sykes (1–6) || Sambito (6) || 2:02 || 24,663 || 38–23 || W4
|-style="background:#cfc;"
| 62 || June 20 || 7:35p.m. CDT || Pirates || W 6–4 || Forsch (8–5) || Candelaria (4–6) || Sambito (7) || 2:14 || 35,955 || 39–23 || W5
|-style="background:#cfc;"tps://www.retrosheet.org/boxesetc/1980/B06200HOU1980.htm
| 63 || June 21 || 7:35p.m. CDT || Pirates || W 4–2 || Ruhle (5–1) || Blyleven (2–7) || Sambito (8) || 2:30 || 45,867 || 40–23 || W6
|-style="background:#fcc;"
| 64 || June 22 || 7:35p.m. CDT || Pirates || L 1–2 || Bibby (8–1) || Niekro (7–6) || Jackson (3) || 2:33 || 46,213 || 40–24 || L1
|-style="background:#fcc;"
| 65 || June 23 || 7:35p.m. CDT || Dodgers || L 0–3 || Sutcliffe (2–4) || Andújar (0–3) || – || 2:29 || 29,753 || 40–25 || L2
|-style="background:#cfc;"
| 66 || June 24 || 7:35p.m. CDT || Dodgers || W 5–4  || LaCorte (4–0) || Beckwith (3–1) || – || 4:13 || 34,388 || 41–25 || W1
|-style="background:#fcc;"
| 67 || June 25 || 7:35p.m. CDT || Dodgers || L 2–9 || Welch (8–2) || Forsch (8–6) || – || 2:50 || 34,416 || 41–26 || L1
|-style="background:#cfc;"
| 68 || June 27 || 7:35p.m. CDT || Reds || W 5–4 || Niekro (8–6) || Pastore (9–4) || Sambito (9) || 2:31 || 36,648 || 42–26 || W1
|-style="background:#fcc;"
| 69 || June 28 || 7:35p.m. CDT || Reds || L 5–8 || Price (1–0) || Richard (9–4) || Hume (11) || 3:08 || 44,025 || 42–27 || L1
|-style="background:#cfc;"
| 70 || June 29 || 5:00p.m. CDT || Reds || W 12–10 || LaCorte (5–0) || Soto (0–3) || Sambito (10) || 3:20 || 38,408 || 43–27 || W1
|-style="background:#fcc;"
| 71 || June 30 || 6:35p.m. CDT || @ Braves || L 4–5  || Hrabosky (4–1) || Sambito (2–1) || – || 2:53 || 8,208 || 43–28 || L1
|-

|-style="background:#fcc;"
| 72 || July 1 || 6:35p.m. CDT || @ Braves || L 4–13 || Alexander (6–3) || Niekro (8–7) || – || 2:47 || 9,546 || 43–29 || L2
|-style="background:#fcc;"
| 73 || July 2 || 6:35p.m. CDT || @ Braves || L 0–14 || Niekro (6–10) || Ruhle (5–2) || – || 2:27 || 21,908 || 43–30 || L3
|-style="background:#cfc;"
| 74 || July 3 || 6:35p.m. CDT || @ Braves || W 4–3 || Richard (10–4) || Boggs (3–4) || LaCorte (7) || 2:44 || 15,769 || 44–30 || W1
|-style="background:#fcc;"
| 75 || July 4 || 7:05p.m. CDT || @ Reds || L 1–8 || Leibrandt (8–4) || Ryan (5–6) || – || 2:42 || 37,047 || 44–31 || L1
|-style="background:#fcc;"
| 76 || July 5  || 4:37p.m. CDT || @ Reds || L 6–8 || Soto (1–3) || Forsch (8–7) || – || 2:46 || N/A || 44–32 || L2
|-style="background:#fcc;"
| 77 || July 5  || 7:58p.m. CDT || @ Reds || L 2–3 || LaCoss (5–7) || Andújar (0–4) || Hume (12) || 2:34 || 44,083 || 44–33 || L3
|-style="background:#cfc;"
| 78 || July 6 || 1:15p.m. CDT || @ Reds || W 3–2 || Niekro (9–7) || Pastore (10–5) || LaCorte (8) || 2:37 || 30,045 || 45–33 || W1
|- style="text-align:center; background:#bbcaff;"
| colspan="12" | 51st All-Star Game in Los Angeles, California
|-style="background:#fcc;"
| 79 || July 10 || 9:30p.m. CDT || @ Dodgers || L 3–4 || Howe (3–4) || Ryan (5–7) || – || 2:52 || 49,692 || 45–34 || L1
|-style="background:#fcc;"
| 80 || July 11 || 7:10p.m. CDT || @ Dodgers || L 2–3 || Reuss (10–2) || Forsch (8–8) || Howe (8) || 2:30 || 42,754 || 45–35 || L2
|-style="background:#cfc;"
| 81 || July 12 || 7:35p.m. CDT || Braves || W 9–5 || Niekro (10–8) || McWilliams (5–6) || Smith (2) || 2:54 || 38,610 || 46–35 || W1
|-style="background:#cfc;"
| 82 || July 13  || 5:35p.m. CDT || Braves || W 6–5 || Sambito (3–1) || Garber (2–5) || LaCorte (9) || 2:48 || N/A || 47–35 || W2
|-style="background:#cfc;"
| 83 || July 13  || 8:58p.m. CDT || Braves || W 6–1 || Ruhle (6–2) || Boggs (3–5) || – || 2:28 || 31,230 || 48–35 || W3
|-style="background:#fcc;"
| 84 || July 14 || 7:35p.m. CDT || Braves || L 0–2 || Niekro (7–11) || Pladson (0–1) || – || 2:19 || 20,247 || 48–36 || L1
|-style="background:#cfc;"
| 85 || July 15 || 7:35p.m. CDT || Phillies || W 3–2 || Sambito (4–1) || Ruthven (8–6) || – || 2:08 || 24,223 || 49–36 || W1
|-style="background:#fcc;"
| 86 || July 16 || 7:35p.m. CDT || Phillies || L 2–4 || Walk (6–0) || Forsch (8–9) || – || 2:06 || 28,532 || 49–37 || L1
|-style="background:#fcc;"
| 87 || July 17 || 7:35p.m. CDT || Phillies || L 1–2 || Carlton (15–4) || Niekro (10–8) || – || 2:18 || 26,403 || 49–38 || L2
|-style="background:#fcc;"
| 88 || July 18 || 7:35p.m. CDT || Expos || L 4–5  || Fryman (4–4) || Smith (1–3) || Norman (4) || 3:24 || 26,389 || 49–39 || L3
|-style="background:#cfc;"
| 89 || July 19  || 5:35p.m. CDT || Expos || W 4–2 || Andújar (1–4) || Lea (2–4) || Smith (3) || 2:44 || 40,499 || 50–39 || W1
|-style="background:#fcc;"
| 90 || July 19  || 8:54p.m. CDT || Expos || L 2–5 || Gullickson (1–2) || Pladson (0–2) || – || 2:35 || 39,507 || 50–40 || L1
|-style="background:#cfc;"
| 91 || July 20 || 7:35p.m. CDT || Expos || W 4–3 || Sambito (5–1) || Norman (0–1) || – || 2:16 || 28,513 || 51–40 || W1
|-style="background:#cfc;"
| 92 || July 21 || 7:35p.m. CDT || Mets || W 3–2 || LaCorte (6–1) || Allen (4–6) || – || 2:23 || 20,548 || 52–40 || W2
|-style="background:#cfc;"
| 93 || July 22 || 7:35p.m. CDT || Mets || W 6–5 || Roberge (1–0) || Glynn (3–3) || Smith (4) || 3:02 || 26,815 || 53–40 || W3
|-style="background:#fcc;"
| 94 || July 23 || 7:35p.m. CDT || Mets || L 3–4 || Reardon (5–5) || LaCorte (6–1) || Allen (16) || 2:44 || 30,236 || 53–41 || L1
|-style="background:#cfc;"
| 95 || July 25 || 6:35p.m. CDT || @ Expos || W 9–8 || LaCorte (7–1) || Sosa (5–4) || – || 3:31 || 50,217 || 54–41 || W1
|-style="background:#fcc;"
| 96 || July 26 || 6:35p.m. CDT || @ Expos || L 1–2  || Sahnsen (7–4) || LaCorte (7–2) || – || 3:46 || 42,400 || 54–42 || L1
|-style="background:#cfc;"
| 97 || July 27 || 12:35p.m. CDT || @ Expos || W 6–3 || Niekro (11–8) || Lee (3–5) || Smith (5) || 3:02 || 41,107 || 55–42 || W1
|-style="background:#cfc;"
| 98 || July 28 || 6:35p.m. CDT || @ Phillies || W 3–2  || Sambito (6–1) || Reed (6–4) || – || 2:41 || 30,181 || 56–42 || W2
|-style="background:#fcc;"
| 99 || July 29 || 6:35p.m. CDT || @ Phillies || L 6–9 || Saucier (5–3) || LaCorte (7–3) || McGraw (8) || 3:05 || 30,252 || 56–43 || L1
|-style="background:#fcc;"
| 100 || July 30 || 6:35p.m. CDT || @ Phillies || L 4–6 || Ruthven (10–7) || Ryan (5–8) || McGraw (9) || 2:36 || 31,342 || 56–44 || L2
|-

|-style="background:#fcc;"
| 101 || August 1 || 7:05p.m. CDT || @ Mets || L 4–5 || Reardon (6–5) || Smith (1–4) || – || 2:42 || 16,612 || 56–45 || L3
|-style="background:#fcc;"
| 102 || August 2 || 6:05p.m. CDT || @ Mets || L 3–5 || Allen (5–6) || Niekro (11–9) || – || 2:46 || 45,426 || 56–46 || L4
|-style="background:#cfc;"
| 103 || August 3 || 1:05p.m. CDT || @ Mets || W 3–2  || Sambito (7–1) || Reardon (6–6) || – || 3:41 || 22,492 || 57–46 || W1
|-style="background:#cfc;"
| 104 || August 4 || 7:35p.m. CDT || Giants || W 4–2 || Ryan (6–8) || Hargesheimer (2–1) || Sambito (11) || 2:19 || 33,884 || 58–46 || W2
|-style="background:#fcc;"
| 105 || August 5 || 7:35p.m. CDT || Giants || L 3–9 || Lavelle (5–5) || Pladson (0–3) || – || 3:03 || 24,198 || 58–47 || L1
|-style="background:#cfc;"
| 106 || August 6 || 7:35p.m. CDT || Giants || W 1–0 || Forsch (9–9) || Blue (9–6) || – || 2:10 || 23,478 || 59–47 || W1
|-style="background:#fcc;"
| 107 || August 7 || 7:35p.m. CDT || Padres || L 1–5 || Shirley (9–7) || Niekro (11–10) || – || 2:59 || 20,044 || 59–48 || L1
|-style="background:#fcc;"
| 108 || August 8 || 7:35p.m. CDT || Padres || L 3–5 || Eichelberger (3–0) || Sambito (7–2) || Fingers (15) || 2:45 || 15,207 || 59–49 || L2
|-style="background:#cfc;"
| 109 || August 9 || 7:35p.m. CDT || Padres || W 9–5 || Smith (2–4) || D'Acquisto (2–3) || – || 2:50 || 21,233 || 60–49 || W1
|-style="background:#fcc;"
| 110 || August 10 || 2:05p.m. CDT || Padres || L 2–3 || Wise (4–5) || Sambito (7–3) || – || 2:21 || 20,514 || 60–50 || L1
|-style="background:#fcc;"
| 111 || August 11 || 9:35p.m. CDT || @ Giants || L 4–5 || Blue (10–6) || Forsch (9–10) || Minton (12) || 2:48 || 10,755 || 60–51 || L2
|-style="background:#fcc;"
| 112 || August 12 || 9:35p.m. CDT || @ Giants || L 0–2 || Ripley (6–5) || Niekro (11–11) || Lavelle (6) || 2:05 || 29,770 || 60–52 || L3
|-style="background:#fcc;"
| 113 || August 13 || 2:05p.m. CDT || @ Giants || L 5–6  || Rowland (1–0) || Smith (2–5) || – || 3:42 || 10,149 || 60–53 || L4
|-style="background:#cfc;"
| 114 || August 14 || 3:00p.m. CDT || @ Padres || W 2–1 || Ryan (7–8) || Curtis (4–8) || – || 2:18 || 12,150 || 61–53 || W1
|-style="background:#cfc;"
| 115 || August 15 || 9:00p.m. CDT || @ Padres || W 3–1  || Smith (3–5) || Rasmussen (2–9) || – || 6:17 || 14,177 || 62–53 || W2
|-style="background:#cfc;"
| 116 || August 17  || 3:00p.m. CDT || @ Padres || W 5–0 || Forsch (10–10) || Jones (5–12) || – || 2:06 || N/A || 63–53 || W3
|-style="background:#cfc;"
| 117 || August 17  || 5:41p.m. CDT || @ Padres || W 9–2 || Niekro (12–11) || Mura (4–5) || – || 2:23 || 16,120 || 64–53 || W4
|-style="background:#cfc;"
| 118 || August 19 || 7:35p.m. CDT || Pirates || W 5–2 || Ryan (8–8) || Candelaria (8–13) || Sambito (12) || 2:23 || 39,415 || 65–53 || W5
|-style="background:#cfc;"
| 119 || August 20 || 7:35p.m. CDT || Pirates || W 5–1 || Ruhle (7–2) || Bibby (15–3) || Smith (6) || 2:54 || 32,112 || 66–53 || W6
|-style="background:#cfc;"
| 120 || August 21 || 7:35p.m. CDT || Pirates || W 12–5 || Sambito (8–3) || Blyleven (7–9) || – || 2:59 || 33,884 || 67–53 || W7
|-style="background:#cfc;"
| 121 || August 22 || 7:35p.m. CDT || Cubs || W 3–2  || LaCorte (8–3) || Caudill (1–3) || – || 3:24 || 34,118 || 68–53 || W8
|-style="background:#cfc;"
| 122 || August 23 || 7:35p.m. CDT || Cubs || W 1–0  || Niekro (13–11) || Riley (0–4) || – || 4:47 || 25,031 || 69–53 || W9
|-style="background:#cfc;"
| 123 || August 24 || 7:35p.m. CDT || Cubs || W 2–1 || Ryan (9–8) || Caudill (1–4) || – || 2:22 || 25,703 || 70–53 || W10
|-style="background:#fcc;"
| 124 || August 25 || 7:38p.m. CDT || @ Cardinals || L 1–3 || Hood (3–5) || Ruhle (7–3) || – || 2:16 || 9,185 || 70–54 || L1
|-style="background:#cfc;"
| 125 || August 26 || 7:37p.m. CDT || @ Cardinals || W 7–2 || Niekro (14–11) || Kaat (5–6) || – || 2:18 || 10,859 || 71–54 || W1
|-style="background:#fcc;"
| 126 || August 27 || 7:37p.m. CDT || @ Cardinals || L 2–10 || Martin (1–0) || Forsch (10–11) || – || 2:41 || 10,025 || 71–55 || L1
|-style="background:#cfc;"
| 127 || August 28 || 1:30p.m. CDT || @ Cubs || W 4–1 || Andújar (2–4) || Lamp (10–10) || Sambito (13) || 2:47 || 18,694 || 72–55 || W1
|-style="background:#cfc;"
| 128 || August 29 || 1:30p.m. CDT || @ Cubs || W 6–5 || Smith (4–5) || Tidrow (5–5) || LaCorte (10) || 2:49 || 9,994 || 73–55 || W2
|-style="background:#cfc;"
| 129 || August 30 || 1:15p.m. CDT || @ Cubs || W 2–0 || Ruhle (8–3) || McGlothen (9–10) || – || 2:47 || 18,803 || 74–55 || W3
|-style="background:#fcc;"
| 130 || August 31 || 1:15p.m. CDT || @ Cubs || L 7–8 || Tidrow (6–5) || LaCorte (8–4) || – || 3:00 || 14,823 || 74–56 || L1
|-

|-style="background:#cfc;"
| 131 || September 1  || 10:00a.m. CDT || @ Pirates || W 10–4 || Smith (5–5) || Robinson (5–8) || – || 3:07 || N/A || 75–56 || W1
|-style="background:#fcc;"
| 132 || September 1  || 2:42p.m. CDT || @ Pirates || L 5–7 || Rhoden (5–4) || Pladson (0–4) || Jackson (8) || 2:57 || 26,374 || 75–57 || L1
|-style="background:#fcc;"
| 133 || September 3 || 6:35p.m. CDT || @ Pirates || L 4–10 || Candelaria (10–13) || Andújar (2–5) || Romo (9) || 3:00 || 18,502 || 75–58 || L2
|-style="background:#fcc;"
| 134 || September 5 || 7:40p.m. CDT || Cardinals || L 5–7 || Seaman (3–1) || Sambito (8–4) || Frazier (2) || 3:15 || 19,628 || 75–59 || L3
|-style="background:#cfc;"
| 135 || September 6  || 5:38p.m. CDT || Cardinals || W 9–5 || Niekro (15–11) || Sykes (6–10) || Niemann (1) || 2:40 || N/A || 76–59 || W1
|-style="background:#cfc;"
| 136 || September 6  || 8:49p.m. CDT || Cardinals || W 6–4 || Ruhle (9–3) || Martin (1–1) || – || 2:02 || 34,350 || 77–59 || W2
|-style="background:#fcc;"
| 137 || September 7 || 6:09p.m. CDT || Cardinals || L 0–2 || Vuckovich (10–9) || Forsch (10–12) || – || 2:00 || 16,475 || 77–60 || L1
|-style="background:#cfc;"
| 138 || September 9 || 7:35p.m. CDT || Dodgers || W 5–4 || Smith (6–5) || Howe (6–7) || Sambito (14) || 3:06 || 34,546 || 78–60 || W1
|-style="background:#cfc;"
| 139 || September 10 || 7:35p.m. CDT || Dodgers || W 6–5  || Roberge (2–0) || Sutcliffe (3–9) || – || 3:49 || 37,632 || 79–60 || W2
|-style="background:#cfc;"
| 140 || September 12 || 7:35p.m. CDT || Giants || W 5–3 || Niekro (16–11) || Whitson (9–11) || Smith (7) || 2:35 || 23,380 || 80–60 || W3
|-style="background:#cfc;"
| 141 || September 13 || 7:35p.m. CDT || Giants || W 3–2 || Forsch (11–12) || Blue (13–8) || – || 2:10 || 32,526 || 81–60 || W4
|-style="background:#cfc;"
| 142 || September 14 || 6:05p.m. CDT || Giants || W 6–4 || Andújar (3–5) || Montefusco (4–8) || Sambito (15) || 2:43 || 18,471 || 82–60 || W5
|-style="background:#fcc;"
| 143 || September 15 || 7:35p.m. CDT || Padres || L 3–6 || Shirley (11–10) || Ryan (9–9) || – || 2:30 || 9,578 || 82–61 || L1
|-style="background:#fcc;"
| 144 || September 16 || 7:35p.m. CDT || Padres || L 3–4 || Curtis (8–8) || Ruhle (9–4) || Fingers (21) || 2:57 || 20,383 || 82–62 || L2
|-style="background:#fcc;"
| 145 || September 17 || 7:05p.m. CDT || @ Reds || L 0–7 || Soto (10–6) || Niekro (16–12) || – || 2:37 || 25,092 || 82–63 || L3
|-style="background:#cfc;"
| 146 || September 18 || 11:30a.m. CDT || @ Reds || W 10–2 || Forsch (12–12) || Pastore (11–7) || Sambito (16) || 2:37 || 23,861 || 83–63 || W1
|-style="background:#fcc;"
| 147 || September 19 || 9:40p.m. CDT || @ Giants || L 3–4 || Griffin (1–4) || Andújar (3–6) || Holland (6) || 2:45 || 4,377 || 83–64 || L1
|-style="background:#cfc;"
| 148 || September 20 || 3:07p.m. CDT || @ Giants || W 3–2 || Smith (7–5) || Lavelle (6–7) || Sambito (17) || 2:53 || 16,770 || 84–64 || W1
|-style="background:#cfc;"
| 149 || September 21 || 12:23p.m. CDT || @ Giants || W 5–1 || Ruhle (10–4) || Blue (14–9) || – || 2:29 || 19,844 || 85–64 || W2
|-style="background:#cfc;"
| 150 || September 22 || 9:00p.m. CDT || @ Padres || W 4–2 || Niekro (17–12) || Shirley (11–11) || – || 2:40 || 16,513 || 86–64 || W3
|-style="background:#fcc;"
| 151 || September 23 || 7:00p.m. CDT || @ Padres || L 4–9 || Curtis (9–8) || Niemann (0–1) || – || 3:00 || 4,788 || 86–65 || L1
|-style="background:#fcc;"
| 152 || September 24 || 6:35p.m. CDT || @ Braves || L 2–4 || Alexander (14–9) || Andújar (3–7) || Camp (20) || 2:39 || 24,897 || 86–66 || L2
|-style="background:#cfc;"
| 153 || September 25 || 6:35p.m. CDT || @ Braves || W 4–2 || Ryan (10–9) || Niekro (15–16) || Smith (8) || 2:39 || 7,926 || 87–66 || W1
|-style="background:#cfc;"
| 154 || September 26 || 7:35p.m. CDT || Reds || W 2–0 || Ruhle (11–4) || Seaver (10–8) || – || 2:02 || 42,486 || 88–66 || W2
|-style="background:#cfc;"
| 155 || September 27 || 2:05p.m. CDT || Reds || W 2–0 || Niekro (18–12) || Soto (10–7) || Smith (9) || 2:25 || 40,305 || 89–66 || W3
|-style="background:#fcc;"
| 156 || September 28 || 2:05p.m. CDT || Reds || L 5–8 || LaCoss (10–12) || Andújar (3–8) || Hume (24) || 2:52 || 32,756 || 89–67 || L1
|-style="background:#cfc;"
| 157 || September 30 || 7:35p.m. CDT || Braves || W 7–3 || Ryan (11–9) || Alexander (14–10) || Smith (10) || 2:41 || 31,973 || 90–67 || W1
|-

|-style="background:#cfc;"
| 158 || October 1 || 7:35p.m. CDT || Braves || W 5–2 || Ruhle (12–4) || Niekro (15–17) || – || 2:06 || 35,600 || 91–67 || W2
|-style="background:#cfc;"
| 159 || October 2 || 7:35p.m. CDT || Braves || W 3–2 || Niekro (19–12) || McWilliams (9–14) || LaCorte (11) || 2:35 || 45,022 || 92–67 || W3
|-style="background:#fcc;"
| 160 || October 3 || 9:30p.m. CDT || @ Dodgers || L 2–3  || Valenzuela (2–0) || Forsch (12–13) || – || 2:45 || 49,642 || 92–68 || L1
|-style="background:#fcc;"
| 161 || October 4 || 3:20p.m. CDT || @ Dodgers || L 1–2 || Reuss (18–6) || Ryan (11–10) || – || 2:30 || 46,085 || 92–69 || L2
|-style="background:#fcc;"
| 162 || October 5 || 3:00p.m. CDT || @ Dodgers || L 3–4 || Howe (7–9) || LaCorte (8–5) || Sutton (1) || 3:33 || 52,339 || 92–70 || L3
|-style="background:#cfc;"
| 163 || October 6 || 3:00p.m. CDT || @ Dodgers || W 7–1 || Niekro (20–12) || Goltz (7–11) || – || 3:10 || 51,127 || 93–70 || W1
|-

|- style="text-align:center;"
| Legend:       = Win       = Loss       = PostponementBold = Astros team member

Postseason Game log

|-style="background:#fcc;"
| 1 || October 7 || 7:15p.m. CDT || @ Phillies || L 1–3 || Carlton (1–0) || Forsch (0–1) || McGraw (1) || 2:35 || 65,277 || PHI 1–0 || L1
|-style="background:#cfc;"
| 2 || October 8 || 7:15p.m. CDT || @ Phillies || W 7–4  || LaCorte (1–0) || Reed (0–1) || Andújar (1) || 3:34 || 65,476 || Tied 1–1 || W1
|-style="background:#cfc;"
| 3 || October 10 || 2:00p.m. CDT || Phillies || W 1–0  || Smith (1–0) || McGraw (0–1) || – || 3:22 || 44,443 || HOU 2–1 || W2
|-style="background:#fcc;"
| 4 || October 11 || 3:15p.m. CDT || Phillies || L 3–5  || Brusstar (1–0) || Sambito (0–1) || McGraw (2) || 3:55 || 44,952 || Tied 2–2 || L1
|-style="background:#fcc;"
| 5 || October 12 || 7:00p.m. CDT || Phillies || L 7–8  || Ruthven (1–0) || LaCorte (1–1) || – || 3:38 || 44,802 || PHI 3–2 || L2
|-

|- style="text-align:center;"
| Legend:       = Win       = Loss       = PostponementBold = Astros team member

 Composite Box 

 Player stats 

 Batting 

 Starters by position 
Note: Pos = Position; G = Games played; AB = At bats; H = Hits; Avg. = Batting average; HR = Home runs; RBI = Runs batted in

 Other batters 
Note: G = Games played; AB = At bats; H = Hits; Avg. = Batting average; HR = Home runs; RBI = Runs batted in

 Pitching 

 Starting pitchers 
Note: G = Games pitched; IP = Innings pitched; W = Wins; L = Losses; ERA = Earned run average; SO = Strikeouts

 Other pitchers 
Note: G = Games pitched; IP = Innings pitched; W = Wins; L = Losses; ERA = Earned run average; S0 = Strikeouts

 Relief pitchers 
Note: G = Games pitched; IP = Innings pitched; W = Wins; L = Losses; SV = Saves; ERA = Earned run average; SO = Strikeouts

 National League Championship Series 

 Game 1 
October 7: Veterans Stadium, Philadelphia

 Game 2 
October 8: Veterans Stadium, Philadelphia

 Game 3 
October 10: Astrodome, Houston, Texas

 Game 4 
October 11: Astrodome, Houston, Texas

 Game 5 
October 12: Astrodome, Houston, Texas

Game 5 capped the series in fitting fashion, with seemingly endless surprises and excitement. The Astros jumped to an early lead in the first on a run-scoring double by José Cruz. Philadelphia bounced back to take the lead on a two-run single by Bob Boone in the second. The Astros saw Luis Pujols and Enos Cabell thrown out at the plate in the second and fifth, but finally broke through to tie the game 2–2 on an unearned run in the sixth, thanks to an error by Philadelphia's less than surehanded left fielder Greg Luzinski.

Houston took what seemed like a solid 5–2 lead in the seventh on an RBI single by Denny Walling, a wild pitch from Phillies reliever Larry Christenson, and a run-scoring triple by Art Howe. A three-run deficit in the eighth inning against Nolan Ryan seemed insurmountable. But the Phillies would not die. They loaded the bases with nobody out on three straight singles, including two infield hits, and then got two runs on a walk to Pete Rose and a groundout by Keith Moreland. An RBI single by Del Unser tied the game 5–5, and then Manny Trillo put the Phillies ahead with a two-run triple.

The Astros promptly came back to tie the game in the bottom of the eighth, with Rafael Landestoy and José Cruz each singling in a run. Neither team scored in the ninth, but the Phillies got doubles from Unser and Garry Maddox in the tenth to take an 8–7 lead. Philadelphia's Dick Ruthven retired the Astros in order in the bottom of the tenth, and the Phillies had won their first pennant since 1950. They went on to defeat the Kansas City Royals four games to two in the World Series.

 Composite Box 
1980 National League Championship Series (3–2): Philadelphia Phillies''' over Houston Astros

Farm system

References

External links
1980 Houston Astros season at Baseball Reference
1980 Houston Astros season at baseball almanac

Houston Astros seasons
Houston Astros season
National League West champion seasons
Houston